Daniel Vallverdú (born March 17, 1986) is a Venezuelan tennis coach and former professional player. Vallverdu also acts as the coaches' representative on the ATP Player Council and was the Managing Director of the San Diego Open ATP 250.

Biography
Vallverdú has formerly coached Andy Murray (2010–2014), Tomáš Berdych (2014–2016), Juan Martín del Potro, Stan Wawrinka (2019–2022) and most recently he is coaching Grigor Dimitrov (2016–2019, 2022–). Vallverdu has also worked alongside Ivan Lendl, Andre Agassi and Magnus Norman. 

Vallverdú and Murray had a longstanding and successful partnership which led to many tournament wins, including Murray's first Olympic Gold medal in 2012 (Vallverdú was head coach for the British Olympic tennis team), and two Grand Slam wins: the 2012 US Open and 2013 Wimbledon Championships. 

Under Vallverdú's guidance in May 2015, at the age of 29, Czech player Tomáš Berdych reached his highest career singles ranking of No. 4 in the ATP rankings.

He became the coach of Grigor Dimitrov in July 2016. At the time the Bulgarian was No. 40 in the ATP rankings. Vallverdú guided him to his first Masters 1000 title at the 2017 Cincinnati Masters, followed by the ATP Finals title in November 2017, resulting in Dimitrov's career high ranking of No. 3 by the end of 2017. In May 2019, Dimitrov and Vallverdú ended their working relationship.

Vallverdú joined Stan Wawrinka in July 2019 as his coach, together with Magnus Norman. Wawrinka ended 2019 back in the top 20 of the ATP rankings ranked 16 in the world. Magnus Norman and Stan Wawrinka parted ways in September 2020. Vallverdu and Wawrinka ended their working relationship in October 2022. 

In December 2022 Vallverdu agreed to start coaching again Grigor Dimitrov in 2023.

Coaches representative

In June 2018, Vallverdú was voted by the body of ATP Coaches to act as the Coaches' representative in the ATP Player Council. After electing to leave the Players Council for a short period of time Vallverdu was re-elected by the body of ATP Coaches to serve as the Coaches' Representative in the newly formed ATP Player Council of 2021 which included Andy Murray, Rafael Nadal and Roger Federer.

In 2023 Vallverdu was re-elected by the body of ATP Coaches to continue serving as the Coaches' Representative in the newly formed ATP Player Council of 2023.

Tournament Director

In August 2021, after the cancellation of the Asia Swing, Vallverdu instigated the collaboration between the ATP and the San Diego Barnes Tennis Centre which was then allocated a one year 250 tournament license to be held 27 September - 3 October 2021 as a lead up to the Indian Wells Masters which had been postponed to October due to Covid.

Vallverdu took on the role of Managing Director and the tournament  attracted a very strong line up of players including Denis Shapovalov, Andrey Rublev, Kei Nishikori, Dimitrov and Murray. With 8 of the top 20 players attending and the ranking cut off being 42 to get in the main draw it was the 2nd most competitive ATP 250 all season since Doha. Billie Jean King accepted the role of honorary tournament chair.

In 2022, with the Asia swing still cancelled due to Covid, Vallverdu again instigated the collaboration between the ATP and the San Diego Barnes Tennis Centre which was then allocated a second one year 250 tournament license to be held post US Open 17-25 Sept. Vallverdu again took on the position of Managing Director.

Coaching history

Andy Murray
Vallverdú met Andy Murray in the Sánchez-Casal Barcelona Tennis Academy when he was 15, where they were both training to become professional tennis players. The two quickly became best friends.

In June 2008, he became British tennis player Andy Murray's doubles partner for the 2008 Queen's Club Championships in London.

Vallverdú started working with Murray following his split with Miles Maclagan in 2010 and became Murray's de facto coach after he parted company with Alex Corretja in March. He coached Murray, organised practice sessions and served as liaison with Darren Cahill and Sven Groeneveld. "Quiet and unassuming, Vallverdú scouts opponents and helps devise tactical plans. Despite his relative youth, he is known for his professionalism and in-depth knowledge of the game."

Vallverdú was also selected to be the head coach of the British men's tennis team for the London Olympics 2012, in which Murray won the Gold medal.

With Andy Murray, Vallverdú worked actively alongside Ivan Lendl, who joined Murray's team in 2012.

Other memorable highlights of his coaching work with Murray and Lendl included when Murray won two Grand Slam titles, Wimbledon 2013 and the US Open in 2012.

Following a mutual split with Murray in November 2014, Vallverdú took on the head coaching job for Tomáš Berdych.

Tomáš Berdych

Vallverdu started working with Tomáš Berdych following the mutual split from Andy Murray in November 2014.

At the time Tomáš Berdych was ranked World no. 7.

It was an immediate success as Tomáš Berdych reached his second Australian Open semifinal after beating Rafael Nadal, but then losing to Andy Murray in a tense match 6-7 (6-8) 6-0 6-3 7–5.

Under Vallverdú's guidance in May 2015, at the age of 29, Berdych reached his highest career singles ranking of No. 4 in the ATP rankings and entered the Roland Garros grand slam event as the number 4 seed.

On 16 May 2016, Berdych and Vallverdú parted their ways.

Grigor Dimitrov

He became the coach of Grigor Dimitrov in July 2016. At the time the Bulgarian was No. 40 in the ATP rankings. Vallverdú guided him to his first Masters 1000 Win, as he beat Nick Kyrgios in the final of the 2017 Cincinnati Masters. This success was followed by the ATP Finals title for Dimitrov in November 2017, resulting in a career high ranking of No. 3 by the end of 2017. On 7 May 2019, after three years, Dimitrov and Vallverdú ended their working relationship.

In October 2022 after parting ways with Wawrinka, Vallverdu agreed to coach Dimitrov again till the end of the 2022 season which ended in November 2022. On 1 December 2022, it was confirmed he will work with Dimitrov also in 2023.

Stan Wawrinka

After parting ways with Grigor Dimitrov, Vallverdú joined Stan Wawrinka's coaching team before the start of the 2019 grass court season.

Following the departure of Magnus Norman in September 2020 Vallverdu became the de facto head coach.

Vallverdu and Wawrinka ended their working relationship in October 2022.

Karolína Plíšková

In November 2019, Vallverdú agreed to work bilaterally (he was already coaching Stan Wawrinka) with Karolína Plíšková, ranked number 2 in the WTA rankings. She successfully went on to defend her Premier Brisbane International title in January 2020 beating Naomi Osaka in the semifinal and Madison Keys in the final. Plíšková also reached the final of the Rome Masters in September 2020 defending her title but was forced to retire due to an injury.

Plíšková and Vallverdú ended their working relationship at the end of 2020 due to time commitments.

Philanthropy

COVID 19—Coaches & Players Fan Experiences

During the COVID-19 pandemic, Vallverdú in collaboration with the ATP launched the coaches and players fan experience initiative to help raise funds for tennis coaches most affected during the pandemic. The first round of bidding raised over 90,000 USD.

In July 2020, The second round was launched and gave fans the chance to bid on more exclusive fan experiences  which included hitting with players Murray, Wawrinka, Lopez and Dimitrov.

The highest individual bid was made for two Wimbledon Final tickets and the chance to hit with Grand Slam Champion Murray and reached close to 52,000 USD. The bid to hit with the Swiss Grand Slam Champion Wawrinka went for 27,000 US Dollars.

In total the initiative launched by Vallverdú raised 218,000 US Dollars.

HIA - High Impact Athletes

In 2020, Vallverdu became an ambassador for the charity organization HIA Athletes. He is quoted saying “My family and I are passionate about the environment and helping the planet. Having coached some of the greatest tennis players in the world I understand how important optimization is. High Impact Athletes helps me optimize my giving by providing easy access to the most effective, impactful charities in the world.”

Tour career

Doubles
In June 2008, he became British tennis player Andy Murray's doubles partner for the 2008 Queen's Club Championships at Queens Club in London.

Davis Cup
Vallverdú has played for Venezuela in eight matches over six ties, including a semifinal appearance in Group I of the Americas Zone in 2005.

Educational background

Sánchez-Casal Barcelona Tennis Academy 

Vallverdú attended the Sánchez-Casal Barcelona Tennis Academy when he was 15, where he met Andy Murray and were both training to become professional tennis players. The two quickly became best friends.

University of Miami

Vallverdú graduated from the University of Miami in 2009 with a BA in International Marketing and Finance.

During his time at the University of Miami, Vallverdú was captain of the university tennis team.

He received five all-American honors, was no. 3 in the nation in singles and no. 1 in the nation in doubles with teammate Carl Mikael Sundberg.

References

External links
 
 Daniel Vallverdú at the Association of Tennis Professionals Coach profile
 
 

1986 births
Living people
Venezuelan male tennis players
Sportspeople from Valencia, Venezuela
Miami Hurricanes men's tennis players